Rita dalla Chiesa (born 31 August 1947) is an Italian television presenter and politician.

Early life 
Her father was general Carlo Alberto dalla Chiesa, assassinated in 1982 together with his wife, Emanuela Setti Carraro.

Career
Her career began in 1983, when she presented the show Vediamoci sul due on Raidue, and later Pane e marmellata with Fabrizio Frizzi.

She moved to Fininvest where, in 1988, she presented Forum, a daily program about court cases broadcasting on Canale 5. In the 1990s she presented the prime time show 44 Gatti. She stayed on that show until 1997, when it was moved to Retequattro. She switched to a new show on Canale 5, Signore Mie, and then presented Il Trucco c'è, a Saturday afternoon talk show for Retequattro.

After a return to RAI in 2002/2003, presenting the morning show I Fatti Vostri. In September 2003 she returned to Forum, which in 2008 moved to Canale 5.

In September 2008 she presented Il Ballo delle Debuttanti, a prime time talent show about dance. In 2010 she began hosting Forum Bau, a show about pets.

In September 2022 she was elected a Member of the Chamber of Deputies with Forza Italia.

Television
 Alquanto occupata (Raidue, 1980–1981)
Vediamoci sul due (Raidue, 1982–1984)
Pane e marmellata (Raidue, 1984–1985)
Domenica più
Forum (Canale 5, 1988–1997, 2003–present)
Forum giovani (Canale 5, 1994)
44 gatti (Canale 5, 1993)
Affari di famiglia (Canale 5, 1992–1993)
Pomeriggio di festa (Canale 5, 1994)
Canzoni sotto l'albero (Canale 5, 1993–1996)
Forum di sera (Canale 5, Retequattro, 1994–1997)
Signore mie (Canale 5, 1998)
Il trucco c'è (Retequattro, 1999–2001)
I fatti vostri (Raidue, 2002–2003)
Telethon (2000) (Raidue, 2000)
C'era una volta la fattoria (Rete 4, 2002)
Vivere meglio (Rete 4, 2003)
Il verdetto (Retequattro, 2005)
Sessione pomeridiana di Forum (Retequattro, 2006–present)
Il ballo delle debuttanti (Canale 5, 2008)
Forum Bau (Retequattro, 2010–present)

Personal life 
Frizzi was her second husband from 1992-1998, when she asked him to separate.

References

Living people
1947 births
Italian television presenters
Italian women television presenters
Forza Italia (2013) politicians